Lochie O'Brien (born 18 September 1999) is a professional Australian rules footballer playing for the Carlton Football Club in the Australian Football League (AFL).

Early life and junior career 
Lochie grew up in rural Victoria and played junior football for the South Mildura Football Club. Growing up a Collingwood fan, his grandfather Denis managed to play a single senior game for the Magpies in 1971. Lochie had a promising athletics career growing up, breaking regional records in the 400 and 1500m categories and eventually breaking the state's school record with a time of 51.06 seconds. His impressive sporting background gave him the opportunity to attend Geelong Grammar School. It was not long before he was picked up by the Bendigo Pioneers of the TAC Cup.

AFL career
O'Brien was drafted by Carlton with its second selection (No. 10 overall) in the 2017 national draft. He made his debut in Round 4, 2018 against  at Blundstone Arena, and the following week was given a contract extension to the end of 2021.

O'Brien played regular senior football in his first two seasons, appearing in 35 of 44 matches, before falling out of favour and playing only six across in 2020 and 2021. He was demoted from the club's senior list to its rookie list for the 2022 season.

Statistics
Statistics are correct to the end of round 23, 2022.

|- style="background-color: #EAEAEA"
! scope="row" style="text-align:center" | 2018
|style="text-align:center;"|
| 4 || 18 || 2 || 1 || 168 || 83 || 251 || 79 || 26 || 0.1 || 0.1 || 9.3 || 4.6 || 13.9 || 4.4 || 1.4 
|-
! scope="row" style="text-align:center" | 2019
|style="text-align:center;"| 
| 4 || 14 || 6 || 4 || 130 || 45 || 175 || 64 || 16 || 0.4 || 0.1 || 9.3 || 3.2 || 12.5 || 4.6 || 1.1
|-
! scope="row" style="text-align:center" | 2020
|style="text-align:center;"| 
| 4 || 1 || 1 || 0 || 5 || 2 || 7 || 2 || 2 || 1.0 || 0.0 || 5.0 || 2.0 || 7.0 || 2.0 || 1.0
|-
! scope="row" style="text-align:center" | 2021
|style="text-align:center;"| 
| 4 || 5 || 1 || 3 || 49 || 31 || 80 || 20 || 9 || 0.2 || 0.6 || 9.8 || 6.2 || 16.0 || 4.0 || 1.8
|-
! scope="row" style="text-align:center" | 2022
|style="text-align:center;"| 
| 4 || 19 || 5 || 9 || 238 || 99|| 337 || 98 || 27 || 0.4 || 0.5 || 12.5 || 5.2 || 17.7 || 5.1 || 1.4
|- class="sortbottom"
! colspan=3| Career
! 60
! 16
! 17 
! 619
! 267	 
! 886
! 279
! 83
! 0.3
! 0.3 
! 10.3
! 4.4 
! 14.8
! 4.6 
! 1.4
|}

References

External links

1999 births
Living people
Carlton Football Club players
Bendigo Pioneers players
Preston Football Club (VFA) players
Australian rules footballers from Victoria (Australia)